Manfred Kinder (born 20 April 1938) is a West German former sprinter. He won a silver and a bronze medal in the 4 × 400 m relay at the 1960 and 1968 Summer Olympics, respectively, and finished in fifth place in 1964. Individually, he competed in the 400 m and 800 m, with the best result of fifth place in the 400 m in 1960.

At the European Championships, he won seven medals in total between 1962 and 1969, in the 400 m and 4 × 400 m relay events.

References

External links 

 
 
 

1938 births
Living people
West German male sprinters
Olympic athletes of the United Team of Germany
Olympic athletes of West Germany
Olympic silver medalists for the United Team of Germany
Olympic bronze medalists for West Germany
Olympic silver medalists in athletics (track and field)
Olympic bronze medalists in athletics (track and field)
Athletes (track and field) at the 1960 Summer Olympics
Athletes (track and field) at the 1964 Summer Olympics
Athletes (track and field) at the 1968 Summer Olympics
Medalists at the 1968 Summer Olympics
Medalists at the 1960 Summer Olympics
European Athletics Championships medalists
Sportspeople from Königsberg